Totnes Community Hospitalis a health facility on Coronation Road in Totnes, Devon, England. It is managed by Torbay and South Devon NHS Foundation Trust.

History

The facilities has its origins in a cottage hospital established by the conversion of a house on Steamer Quay Road in the 19th century. This was replaced by a new purpose-built cottage hospital built by Thomas Brook on Bridgetown Hill in the 1890s. The Bridgetown Hill facility eventually became decrepit and, after the hospital closed in the early 1990s, the site was developed as Varian Court.

The current facility on Coronation Road, which replaced both the old Bridgetown Hill facility and the Broomborough Hospital, was opened by the Duchess of Kent in 1993. The hospital was briefly closed because of the discovery of the legionella bacteria in January 2019.

References

Further reading

External links

Hospitals in Devon
Hospital buildings completed in 1993
NHS hospitals in England
Totnes